Sportkring Sint-Niklaas (formerly known as FCN Sint-Niklaas) is a Belgian football club from Sint-Niklaas, currently playing in the Belgian Fourth Division.

External links
 Official site

 
Sint-Niklaas, Sportkring
Association football clubs established in 1993
1993 establishments in Belgium
Sint-Niklaas